Paper Year is a 2018 Canadian romantic drama film written and directed by Rebecca Addelman and starring Eve Hewson, Avan Jogia, Hamish Linklater and Andie MacDowell.  It is Addelman's feature debut.

Cast
Andie MacDowell as Joanne Winters
Avan Jogia as Dan Delaney
Eve Hewson as Franny Winters
Hamish Linklater as Noah Bearinger
Evan Stern as Young PA
Andrew Markowiak as Geoff

Production
According to Addelman, most of the film was shot in Toronto.

Reception
Kate Taylor of The Globe and Mail awarded the film three stars out of four. Bruce DeMara of the Toronto Star also gave the film three stars out of four.

References

External links
 
 

Canadian romantic drama films
English-language Canadian films
Films shot in Toronto
2018 romantic drama films
2010s English-language films
2010s Canadian films